See also Education in Greenland

The University of Greenland is Greenland's only university. It is in the capital city of Nuuk. Most courses are taught in Danish, a few in Greenlandic and classes by exchange lecturers often in English.

The university had an enrollment of 205 students in 2018, composed of mostly Greenlandic inhabitants. It has around fourteen academic staff and five technical-administrative employees. The modest student population is due, in part, to most Greenlandic students going to universities in Denmark.

History
The University of Greenland was established in 1987 to provide local higher education for Greenland. It was originally located in the former Moravian mission station of Neu Herrnhut, and moved into a dedicated research complex, Ilimmarfik, in 2009. The university has a DKK 14.8 million budget.

Institutes 

The university has four institutes:

 Institute of Learning
 Institute of Nursing and Health Science
 Institute of Social Science, Economics and Journalism
 Institute of Culture, Language and History

The university awards baccalaureate degrees in all departments and Master's Degrees in all areas except theology. Doctorate programmes are also offered.

Rector
Tine Pars became director of Ilisimatusarfik at the beginning of 2009 after the former rector, Ole Marquardt, resigned in protest over new administrative laws introduced to the university in 2007.

Guest faculty
Due to the small number of faculty, many specialized classes are offered by guest faculty, often coming from Danish universities, but also coming from other countries. 
Guest faculty at Ilisimatusarfik are often specialists for research on Greenland, combining teaching at Ilisimatusarfik with their research while staying on Greenland.

Library 
The university library holds approximately 30,000 volumes.

See also 

 Education in Greenland

Notes and references

External links

Related 
 Arctic Technology Centre, a Department of DTU

Education in Greenland
Educational institutions established in 1987
Universities in Greenland
University of Greenland
Buildings and structures in Nuuk
Universities established in the 1980s
1987 establishments in Greenland